The British Federation of Film Societies (BFFS), which has used the trading name Cinema For All since 2014, is the national organisation for the development and support of the film society and community cinema movement in the United Kingdom.

Information
It offers a wide range of services and resources dedicated to the needs of community cinemas and is based in The Workstation, in Sheffield's Cultural Industries Quarter. The president is Derek Malcolm and the patron is Ken Loach.

It has held the Film Society of the Year Awards annually since 1969. The 2014 Engholm Prize winner for the Film Society of the Year is Dungannon Film Club in Northern Ireland.

The British Federation of Film Societies was founded in 1932; its inaugural meeting was held at Welwyn and attended by Anthony Asquith and John Grierson. The federation was then based in London; early members of the executive included Ellen Wilkinson.

References

External links
Cinema For All Website
Iranian Movies Website

Organizations established in 1946
Film societies in the United Kingdom
Mass media in Sheffield
Organisations based in Sheffield
Film organisations in the United Kingdom
1946 establishments in the United Kingdom